Sreekala Sasidharan is an Indian actress who mainly acts in Malayalam television serials.

Early and personal life

Sreekala was born on 2 August 1984 in Cherukunnu in Kannur district of Kerala to Sasidharan and Geetha. She has an elder sister, Sreejaya. She was trained in Classical dance, Ottamthullal, Kathakali and music since childhood. She has done her degree in Bachelor of Arts from S. N. College, Kannur and is a former university Kalathilakam.

She married her longtime boyfriend Vipin Kuttikara in 2012. They have a son, Samved born in 2013 and a daughter, Sanvitha born in 2021.

Career
Sreekala made her debut through the serial Kayamkulam Kochunni and later acted in supporting roles in several serials before she became popular through her character of Sophie in the Malayalam serial Ente Manasaputri, which was one of the top-rated serials in Malayalam television. Her other well known serials include Snehatheeram, Ammamanasu, Ulladakkam, Devimahatmyam and Amma.  In 2013, she made her Tamil debut the through the serial Aval. She took a break post her marriage. In 2016, she made a comeback through the serial Rathrimazha. She has acted in more than 40 television serials. She also has acted in few films, albums and advertisements.

Filmography

Television

Serials (Partial)
 All serials are in Malayalam unless noted otherwise.

TV shows
 Bhagyavaram (Amrita TV) - Host
 Priya Geethangal (City Channel) - Host
 Chithrageetham - Host
 Annie's Kitchen
 Onnum Onnum Moonu
 Varthaprabhatham
 Comedy Stars
 Comedy Super Nite
 Sarigama
 Swantham Manasaputhri Sreekala
 Flowers Oru Kodi as Contestant
 2010- Pappayum 12 Nakshathrangalum (Asianet)

Awards

2008-Asianet Television Award for Best actress  (Ente Manasaputhri)
2008- Frame Media Awards 2008 - Best actress (Ente Manasaputhri)
2012-Asianet Television Award Best Star PAIR : Along with Sarath Das (Amma)
2017-Mangalam Awards -SPECIAL JURY (Rathrimazha)
 Sathyan Memorial Award

Albums

 Sreeramamantharam
 Nandagopalam 
 Koithulsavam
 Ambilikannan

References

External links

1984 births
21st-century Indian actresses
Actresses from Kerala
Actresses in Malayalam cinema
Indian film actresses
Living people
Indian television actresses
Actresses in Malayalam television
Actresses in Tamil television